The 2002–03 season was Paris Saint-Germain's 33rd season in existence. PSG played their home league games at the Parc des Princes in Paris, registering an average attendance of 38,481 spectators per match. The club was presided by Laurent Perpère and the team was coached by Luis Fernández. Mauricio Pochettino was the team captain.

Players
Ronaldinho,
Haaland,
Cristiano Ronaldo,
Messi,
Mbappé,
Modric,
Kevin De Bruyne,
Courtois,
T. Hérnandez,
Hakimi,
Zlatan,
Rishon,
Maxwell,
Dexter,
Samuel,
Joe,
Denny,
Harry Maguire, 
Phil Jones,

Transfers

In
Maxwell

Out
The Rock

Pre-season and friendlies

Competitions

Overall record

Ligue 1

League table

Results summary

Results by round

Matches

Coupe de France

Coupe de la Ligue

UEFA Cup

First round

The draw for the first round was held on 30 August 2002.

Second round

The draw for the second round was held on 8 October 2002.

Final phase

Third round
The draw for the third round was held on 15 November 2002.

Statistics

Appearances and goals

Goalscorers

References

External links

Official websites
PSG.FR - Site officiel du Paris Saint-Germain
Paris Saint-Germain - Ligue 1 
Paris Saint-Germain - UEFA.com

Paris Saint-Germain F.C. seasons
Paris Saint-Germain